A church pennant is a pennant flown to indicate that a religious service is in progress.  It is flown on ships and establishments (bases).

Marine Nationale
The French Navy maintained a church pennant but it fell into disuse in 1905.

Royal Navy and Royal Netherlands Navy

The Church Pennant as used by the Royal Navy, other navies of the Commonwealth, and the Royal Netherlands Navy.

History
The broad pennant combination of the English Flag at the hoist and the Dutch National Flag in the fly originates from the Anglo-Dutch wars of the late 17th century, when it was used on Sundays to indicate that a service was in progress and a ceasefire existed between the warring nations.

United States Navy

The United States Navy maintains several church pennants, of which the appropriate one is flown immediately above the ensign wherever the ensign is displayed, at the gaff when under way, or at the flagstaff when not under way, when religious services are held aboard ship by a Navy chaplain. Originally, the only authorized church pennant was for Christian chaplains, regardless of specific denomination.  Later in 1975, the Secretary of Navy approved a similar Jewish worship pennant.

See also
United States military chaplain symbols

References

Religious flags
Royal Navy
Military flags of the United States
Religion in the United States military
Naval flags